Yodwanpadet Suwanwichit, born Pravit Suwanwichit (19 November 1961), is a Thai Muay Thai fighter and promoter, amateur boxer and Royal Thai Air Force group captain. He is a former Rajadamnern and Lumpinee champion, known by the ring names Wanpadet Sitkhrumai and Wanpadet Phukrongfah, among others. He won gold in boxing at the 1987 and 1989 SEA Games, and competed in the men's light welterweight event at the 1988 Summer Olympics.

In 2012 (aged 51), he fought a publicity match against Somluck Kamsing at Rajadamnern Stadium, where tickets sold out for the first time in over 15 years.

References

1961 births
Living people
Yodwanpadet Suwanwichit
Yodwanpadet Suwanwichit
Yodwanpadet Suwanwichit
Yodwanpadet Suwanwichit
Boxers at the 1988 Summer Olympics
Light-welterweight boxers
Yodwanpadet Suwanwichit